is a private women's junior college in the city of Ichinomiya in Aichi Prefecture, Japan. The predecessor of the school was founded in 1941, and it was chartered as a university in 1955.

Alumni 
 Mayumi Hashimoto, CEO of Book Off.

External links
 Official website 

Japanese junior colleges
Educational institutions established in 1941
Private universities and colleges in Japan
Universities and colleges in Aichi Prefecture
1941 establishments in Japan